Meydan (also Romanized as Meydān) is a village in Ajam Rural District, Dishmok District, Kohgiluyeh County, Kohgiluyeh and Boyer-Ahmad Province, Iran. At the 2006 census, its population was 48, in 9 families.

References 

Populated places in Kohgiluyeh County